Jean Leblond (2 June 1920 – 1996) was a Belgian long-distance runner. He competed in the marathon at the 1952 Summer Olympics.

References

External links
  

1920 births
1996 deaths
Athletes (track and field) at the 1952 Summer Olympics
Belgian male long-distance runners
Belgian male marathon runners
Olympic athletes of Belgium
Sportspeople from Hainaut (province)